Alastair Ninian John Gordon, 6th Marquess of Aberdeen and Temair (20 July 1920 – 19 August 2002) was a British botanical artist and art critic who succeeded to a peerage later in life.

Early life and World War II
Gordon was the youngest of five children and the fourth son of Lord Dudley Gordon. He was raised in Kent and attended Harrow before entering Gray's School of Art. Commissioned into the Scots Guards in 1939, he served in the Middle East and North Africa before being invalided to Syria after an Irish Guardsman accidentally shot him in the shoulder. Returning to active service, he fought in Italy and North-West Europe before being demobilized as a staff captain in 1946. After leaving the services, he and fellow veteran and nobleman Earl Haig enrolled at the Camberwell School of Art.

Career as artist
It was at Camberwell that Gordon began to specialize in botanical paintings. Several exhibitions of his art would be held in London, New York, Chicago, and Sydney. Gordon was also a member of the International Association of Art Critics and the modern art correspondent for Connoisseur magazine in the 1960s. It was at this time (1965) that his father inherited the Marquessate and Alastair became Lord Alastair Gordon.

Gordon settled at Ashampstead, Berkshire, far from his ancestral home at Haddo, allowing him to enjoy the company of artistic, rather than country, society. Aside from his art, he also enjoyed a longtime role as an amateur singer in the Bach Choir.

Later life
Inheriting the marquessate after the death of his brother in 1984, he sat as a crossbencher in the House of Lords. He attended the Lords only sparingly to speak on topics of interest to him. In his last year of life, he frequently wrote letters and columns on art criticism and other subjects for newspapers. However, he was best known for magazine and other pieces describing his experiences in the brothels of Knightsbridge and Beirut, an activity regarded by his wife with "tolerant amusement."

Personal life
In 1950, Aberdeen married the ceramic sculptor Anne Barry, daughter of Black Watch Lieutenant-Colonel Gerald Barry, MC, of Great Witchingham, Norfolk, sometime Deputy Military Secretary of the Eastern Army of India, and Lady Margaret, daughter of Jacob Pleydell-Bouverie, 6th Earl of Radnor.

They had two daughters and a son:
 Lady Emma Cecile Gordon (b. 26 May 1953), married firstly Dr. Rodney Foale, and secondly John Dewe Mathews
 Alexander George Gordon, 7th Marquess of Aberdeen and Temair (31 March 1955 – 12 March 2020)
 Lady Sophia Katherine Gordon (20 July 1960 – 28 December 2005)

References

External links

1920 births
2002 deaths
6
People educated at Harrow School
Scots Guards officers
British Army personnel of World War II
British art critics
20th-century British painters
Crossbench hereditary peers
British male painters
20th-century British male artists
Alumni of Gray's School of Art
Aberdeen and Temair